Female Perversions is a 1996 erotic drama film directed by Susan Streitfeld (in her feature directorial debut), based on the 1991 book Female Perversions: The Temptations of Emma Bovary by American psychoanalyst Louise J. Kaplan. It stars Tilda Swinton, Amy Madigan, Karen Sillas, Frances Fisher, Laila Robins, Paulina Porizkova, and Clancy Brown. Aspects of female psychology, particularly the more morbid, are explored through the interactions of the characters and through their fantasies.

Plot
Eve Stephens, a Los Angeles trial attorney, is almost at the peak of her career: being appointed as a judge. Her private life is less successful. Beneath her cool exterior, Eve is filled with self-doubt and struggles to find satisfaction while conforming to society's expectations of her as a woman. She is troubled by erotic nightmares and flashbacks to the lives of her parents, centering on her unfeeling father and the suspicious death of her mother, Beth. Although she has occasional intense sex – initially with a male geologist called John, later with a female psychiatrist, Renee – the relationships lack warmth or commitment on her part. She also feels threatened by Langley Flynn, a younger woman being lined up to replace her as an attorney.

Eve's professional and personal lives start to unravel when her intelligent but disturbed sister Maddie, a doctoral student whom Eve believes to be a kleptomaniac, is arrested for repeated shoplifting. After Eve bails her out, Maddie steals the "lucky suit" that Eve planned to wear to her interview with the California Governor about her potential judgeship. During the interview, Eve's anger toward Maddie manifests itself when she tells the Governor that she has no time for family. Feeling disadvantaged as a candidate by her status as an unmarried woman, Eve fears that this admission will cost her the appointment, and subsequently flies into a rage. The two sisters begin to recognize the malignant influence of their parents on their lives and the unsatisfactory responses they unconsciously adopted, one seeking compensation in stealing and the other in sex.

In the end, the Governor approves Eve's appointment. Later, Eve comes to the aid of Maddie's neighbor Edwina ("Ed"), a tomboyish 13yearold who uses selfharm to cope with the struggles of puberty. As Ed prepares to attempt suicide by jumping off a cliff, Eve runs up behind her and pulls her back from the edge. The last shot is of Ed's face pressed into Eve's lap.

Cast

Reception
The film was rated 3.5 out of 4 stars by Roger Ebert, 4 out of 5 stars by The Austin Chronicle and 3 out of 5 stars by Empire magazine. Entertainment Weekly gave it a C grade.

References

External links
 
 
 
 
 

1996 films
1996 directorial debut films
1996 drama films
1996 LGBT-related films
1990s English-language films
1990s erotic drama films
1990s psychological drama films
American erotic drama films
American LGBT-related films
American psychological drama films
English-language German films
Female bisexuality in film
Films about lawyers
Films about sisters
Films based on non-fiction books
Films set in Los Angeles
German erotic drama films
German LGBT-related films
German psychological drama films
LGBT-related drama films
1990s American films
1990s German films